The 1962 DFB-Pokal Final decided the winner of the 1961–62 DFB-Pokal, the 19th season of Germany's knockout football cup competition. It was played on 29 August 1962 at the Niedersachsenstadion in Hanover. 1. FC Nürnberg won the match 2–1 after extra time against Fortuna Düsseldorf, to claim their 3rd cup title.

Route to the final
The DFB-Pokal began with 16 teams in a single-elimination knockout cup competition. There were a total of three rounds leading up to the final. Teams were drawn against each other, and the winner after 90 minutes would advance. If still tied, 30 minutes of extra time was played. If the score was still level, a replay would take place at the original away team's stadium. If still level after 90 minutes, 30 minutes of extra time was played. If the score was still level, a drawing of lots would decide who would advance to the next round.

Note: In all results below, the score of the finalist is given first (H: home; A: away).

Match

Details

References

External links
 Match report at kicker.de 
 Match report at WorldFootball.net
 Match report at Fussballdaten.de 

1. FC Nürnberg matches
Fortuna Düsseldorf matches
1961–62 in German football cups
1962
Sports competitions in Hanover
20th century in Hanover
August 1962 sports events in Europe